St. Patrick's or Saint Patrick's may refer to:

Associated with St. Patrick
Saint Patrick, the Catholic patron saint of Ireland
Saint Patrick's Day, the saint's feast day
St. Patrick's blue, the saint's colour
Saint Patrick's Saltire, a flag design that is part of the Union Jack
Saint Patrick's Breastplate, a prayer in Old Irish
Saint Patrick's Society for the Foreign Missions, a Catholic religious order in Ireland

Sporting clubs
St Patrick's Athletic F.C., an Irish association football club in Dublin
St Patrick's GFC, Cullyhanna, a Gaelic football club in County Armagh
St. Patrick's GAC Loup, a Gaelic football club in Londonderry

Places

Australia 

 St Patrick's Seminary, a Catholic seminary in Manly, New South Wales in Australia
 St Patrick's Cemetery, North Parramatta in Parramatta, New South Wales

Canada 

 St Patrick's, Newfoundland and Labrador, a community in the Baie Verte electoral district of the Province of Newfoundland and Labrador
 St Patrick's (civil parish, Prince Edward Island) in the Province of Prince Edward Island
 Saint Patrick Parish, New Brunswick in the Province of New Brunswick

Ireland 

 St Patrick's College, Maynooth, a Catholic university and seminary in County Kildare
 St Patrick's Purgatory, a pilgrimage site in County Donegal
 St Patrick's (civil parish, Clare and Limerick)
 St Patrick's Street in Cork
 St. Patrick's, Carlow College, a third level liberal arts college in Carlow
 Dublin St Patrick's (UK Parliament constituency), a constituency in the British Parliament that was dissolved in 1922

Pakistan 

 St. Patrick's High School, Karachi, a secondary school in Karachi

Singapore 

 Saint Patrick's School, Singapore, a secondary school in Singapore

South Africa 

 St. Patrick's Christian Brothers' College, Kimberley

Sri Lanka 
St. Patrick's College, Jaffna

United States 

 Saint Patrick's Seminary and University in Menlo Park, California

Other
Saint Patrick's Battalion, an American unit which deserted & fought on the Mexican side in the Mexican–American War

See also
Saint Patrick (disambiguation)
St. Patrick's Cathedral (disambiguation)
St. Patrick's Church (disambiguation)
St. Patrick's College (disambiguation)
St. Patrick's School (disambiguation)
St. Patrick's High School (disambiguation)